Clementina Trenholm Fessenden (4 May 1843 – 14 September 1918) was a Canadian author and social organiser. She was also the mother of Reginald Fessenden, the radio pioneer.

Biography

Clementina Trenholm Fessenden was born in the village of Trenholm, Canada East, on 4 May 1843.

Educated in Montreal schools, she grew up in a home where loyalism and devotion to British traditions were strong.  At twenty-one she married the Reverend Elisha Joseph Fessenden, a Canadian-born Church of England clergyman.  The family moved to Fergus, Ontario, and later to Chippawa, Ontario, on the banks of the Niagara River. There, she raised her four sons and honed her writing skills as one of the first editors of the Niagara Women's Auxiliary Leaflet. In 1893, Elisha accepted the position of rector at St John's Anglican Church in Ancaster, Ontario.

Always trying to find ways to strengthen Canada's links to the British Empire, Clementina identified herself both physically and spiritually with Queen Victoria. She dressed in mourning black like the widowed Queen after her own husband died in 1896. She was responsible for introducing Empire Day in Canadian schools, first in Dundas, Ontario in 1898 on the last school day before May 24, Queen Victoria's birthday. It was celebrated more widely each year and then instituted in England in 1904 by Lord Meath. A typical Empire Day in Canadian schools occupied the entire day and included inspirational speeches by trustees and songs such as The Maple Leaf and Just Before the Battle.

She died in 1918 in Hamilton, Ontario. She was buried in St John's Anglican cemetery, Ancaster, Ontario.

A bronze plaque was installed in her memory on the wall of St John's Anglican Church in 1929, and a monument was placed by her grave in the churchyard which reads "Clementina Fessenden, Founder of Empire Day".

Tribute

An elementary school in Ancaster, Fessenden Public School, was named in her honour and opened in 1959. Two neighbourhoods were also named after her, Fessenden and Trenholme, both on Hamilton Mountain, Ontario.

The first neighbourhood, Fessenden, on the West Mountain, is bounded by Upper Paradise Road on the east, Mohawk Road West on the north and west. This road for the most part runs on a west-east route on the Hamilton Mountain, but on the western end, where this neighbourhood is situated, the road turns south and crosses the Lincoln M. Alexander Parkway, the southern boundary of this neighbourhood.  Landmarks in this neighbourhood include Sir Allan MacNab High School and Regina Mundi Church.

The second neighbourhood, Trenholme, on the East Mountain, is bounded by Limeridge Road East on the north, Pritchard Road on the east, the Lincoln M. Alexander Parkway on the south, and Upper Ottawa Street on the west.  Landmarks in this neighbourhood include Albion Falls Park and Trenholme Park, which is also named after her.

References

External links
 Biography at the Dictionary of Canadian Biography Online

1843 births
1918 deaths
Writers from Hamilton, Ontario
History of Hamilton, Ontario
Canadian women non-fiction writers
Persons of National Historic Significance (Canada)
19th-century Canadian non-fiction writers
19th-century Canadian women writers